Adrianus Todeschinus (1471–1546) was captain of the papal guard under six consecutive popes.

Life
Todeschinus was born in Ghent on 29 October 1471. He became captain of the papal guard under Pope Alexander VI and remained such until his death during the pontificate of Pope Paul III. He wrote a treatise on the art of war, De Castrorum metatione et machinis bellicis commentarius, which has not survived. He died in Rome on 13 May 1546. He had two sons, Paul and Alexander. Paul died in 1555, aged 14. Alexander had a memorial to his father and brother placed in the church of Santa Maria dell'Anima, Rome.

References

1471 births
1546 deaths
Military personnel from Ghent